Cyperus wallichianus is a species of sedge that is native to parts of Nepal.

See also 
 List of Cyperus species

References 

wallichianus
Plants described in 1827
Flora of Nepal
Taxa named by Kurt Polycarp Joachim Sprengel